Jamaal Eric Franklin (born July 21, 1991) is an American professional basketball player who last played for the Converge FiberXers of the Philippine Basketball Association (PBA). He was selected with the 41st overall pick in the 2013 NBA draft by the Memphis Grizzlies. He played college basketball for San Diego State, where he was the Mountain West Conference Player of the Year as well as an All-American in his junior season.

High school career
Franklin played four years at Serrano High School in Phelan, California, then played a prep season at Westwind Prep in Phoenix, Arizona.  As a senior at Serrano, he led the state of California in scoring at 31.7 points per game and was a two-time All-California Interscholastic Federation selection.  In his season at Westwind, he averaged 18.5 points and 6.3 rebounds per game. Franklin was rated as the 24th-best shooting guard in the class of 2009 coming out of Serrano High School and had an ESPN.com grade of 90. Out of high school, Franklin was offered to play basketball at Long Beach State University and San Diego State University.

Franklin played three different sports at Serrano High School: basketball, football (wide receiver and free safety), and track and field, where he was a state high jumper.

College career
Franklin enrolled at San Diego State to play for coach Steve Fisher.  As a freshman, he was part of arguably the best season in school history, along with teammates Kawhi Leonard and Malcolm Thomas, as the Aztecs went 34–3 and captured a #2 seed in the 2011 NCAA Tournament.  Franklin averaged 2.1 points and 1.9 rebounds in 8.1 minutes per game.

In his sophomore campaign, Franklin was thrust into the starting lineup as the Aztecs returned only one starter.  He responded by averaging 17.4 points and 7.9 rebounds per game and leading the Aztecs to an unexpected shared regular-season title and a #6 seed in the 2012 NCAA Tournament.  Franklin was named Mountain West player of the year and was recognized nationally as an All-American by the Associated Press.

Franklin resisted the lure of the professional ranks and returned to San Diego State in 2012–13 for his junior season. He went on to average 16.9 points and 9.5 rebounds in 32 games.

On April 12, 2013, Franklin announced he would forgo his senior season to enter the NBA draft.

Professional career

Memphis Grizzlies (2013–2014)
On June 27, 2013, Franklin was selected with the 41st overall pick by the Memphis Grizzlies in 2013 NBA draft. On July 26, 2013, he signed with the Grizzlies despite not appearing for them in the 2013 NBA Summer League. During his rookie season, he had multiple assignments with the Fort Wayne Mad Ants of the NBA Development League.

In July 2014, Franklin joined the Grizzlies for the 2014 NBA Summer League. On August 31, 2014, he was waived by the Grizzlies.

Zhejiang Lions (2014–2015)
On October 7, 2014, Franklin signed a two-month contract with the Zhejiang Lions of the Chinese Basketball Association. On November 26, 2014, he signed a one-month contract extension with the Lions. Later that day, he scored 53 points on 19-of-29 shooting in Zhejiang's 120–112 win over the Chongqing Flying Dragons. On January 5, 2015, he left Zhejiang after appearing in 26 games. Over those 26 games, he averaged 28.5 points, 6.2 rebounds, 4.6 assists and 1.9 steals per game.

Los Angeles D-Fenders (2015)
On January 21, 2015, Franklin was acquired by the Los Angeles D-Fenders of the NBA Development League. On February 21, he had a season-best game with 27 points and 13 rebounds in a loss to the Austin Spurs.

Denver Nuggets (2015)
On April 12, 2015, Franklin signed with the Denver Nuggets. He made his debut for the team later that day, recording one rebound and one assist in a 122–111 win over the Sacramento Kings. On July 13, 2015, he was waived by the Nuggets.

Second stint in D-League (2015–2016)
On August 29, 2015, Franklin signed with the Guangdong Southern Tigers of the Chinese Basketball Association, but left the team before appearing in a game for them. On December 4, he was reacquired by the Los Angeles D-Fenders.

Shanxi Brave Dragons (2015–2016) 
On December 18, Franklin parted ways with the D-Fenders and signed with the Shanxi Brave Dragons (Shanxi Zhongyu) of the Chinese Basketball Association. On January 10, 2016, Franklin recorded 44 points, 10 rebounds and 20 assists in a 133–123 win over the Jilin Tigers. He dominated the Chinese Basketball Association, averaging incredible numbers during his time with Shanxi. In 19 games, he averaged a triple-double with 33.9 points, 10.8 rebounds and 10.3 assists, in addition to 3.3 steals and 1.5 blocks.

Brujos de Guayama (2016)
On April 5, 2016, Franklin signed with Brujos de Guayama of the Puerto Rican Baloncesto Superior Nacional. He left the team later that month after appearing in just four games.

Third stint in China (2016–2017)
In May 2016, Franklin re-signed with the Shanxi Brave Dragons for the 2016–17 season. On November 14, 2016, Franklin scored 61 points, 12 rebounds and 11 assists in a 125–104 win over the Beijing Ducks. Franklin's performance was the first 60-point triple double in the history of the CBA.

Sichuan Blue Whales (2017–2018) 
On August 18, 2017, the Sichuan Blue Whales officially signed Jamaal Franklin. On August 11, 2018, Franklin re-signed with the Blue Whales.

Shanxi Loongs (2019–2021) 
On July 29, 2019, Franklin agreed to a contract to re-join the Shanxi team, which had been renamed the Shanxi Loongs. On December 10, 2019, Franklin collected a quadruple-double with forty-two points, twelve rebounds, twelve assists and ten steals in a 110–114 loss to the Xinjiang Flying Tigers. He averaged 30.1 points, 9.5 rebounds, 10.1 assists, 2.3 steals and 1.4 blocks per game. On September 12, 2020, Franklin re-signed with the team.

Shanghai Sharks (2021–2022) 
On October 17, 2021, Franklin joined Shanghai Sharks of the Chinese Basketball Association.

Converge FiberXers (2023) 
On January 25, 2023, Franklin signed with the Converge FiberXers of the Philippine Basketball Association (PBA) to replace Ethan Rusbatch as the team's import for the 2023 PBA Governors' Cup.

Career statistics

|-
| align=center | 2013–14
| align=left | Memphis Grizzlies 
| NBA
| 21 || 7.7 || .410 || .456 || 1.000 || 1.1 || .3 || .2 || .0 || 1.9
|-
| align=center | 2014–15
| align=left | Denver Nuggets
| NBA
| 3 || 4.3 || .500 || .500 || .000 || .7 || 1.0 || .0 || .3 || 1.0
|-
| align=center | 2014–15
| align=left | Los Angeles D-Fenders
| NBA D-League
| 21 || 34.1 || .483 || .339 || .793 || 8.9 || 6.5 || 1.5 || .3 || 19.2
|-
| align=center | 2014–15
| align=left | Zhejiang Lions 
| CBA
| 26 || 33.6 || .493 || .361 || .770 || 6.2 || 4.6 || 1.9 || .7 || 28.5
|-
| align=center | 2015–16
| align=left | Brujos de Guayama 
| BSN
| 4 || 26.8 || .368 || .278 || .750 || 6.8 || 2.8 || 1.3 || .8 || 21.5
|-
| align=center | 2015–16
| align=left | Shanxi Brave Dragons 
| CBA
| 19 || 40.6 || .489 || .349 || .813 || 10.8 || 10.3 || 3.3 || 1.5 || 34.0
|-
| align=center | 2016–17
| align=left | Shanxi Brave Dragons 
| CBA
| 36 || 40.7 || .470 || .304 || .837 || 10.3 || 8.8 || 3.3 || 1.2 || 33.6
|-
| align=center | 2017–18
| align=left | Sichuan Blue Whales
| CBA
| 23 || 34.3 || .633 || .368 || .859 || 9.4 || 5.2 || 2.4 || 1.6 || 31.5
|-
| align=center | 2018–19
| align=left | Sichuan Blue Whales
| CBA
| 42 || 39.6 || .607 || .304 || .845 || 9.2 || 7.4 || 2.3 || 1.7 || 30.0
|-
| align=center | 2019–20
| align=left | Shanxi Loongs 
| CBA
| 27 || 39.0 || .563 || .341 || .836 || 9.5 || 10.1 || 2.3 || 1.4 || 30.2
|-
|-class=sortbottom
| align="center" colspan=2 | Career
| All Leagues
| 222 || 34.3 || .519 || .343 || .827 || 8.3 || 6.7 || 2.2 || 1.1 || 27.0

Personal life
Franklin is the cousin of platinum music producer, Hit-Boy.

References

External links

SDSU bio

1991 births
Living people
21st-century African-American sportspeople
African-American basketball players
American expatriate basketball people in China
American expatriate basketball people in the Philippines
American men's basketball players
Basketball players from California
Converge FiberXers players
Denver Nuggets players
Fort Wayne Mad Ants players
Los Angeles D-Fenders players
Memphis Grizzlies draft picks
Memphis Grizzlies players
People from Moreno Valley, California
Philippine Basketball Association imports
San Diego State Aztecs men's basketball players
Shanghai Sharks players
Shanxi Loongs players
Shooting guards
Sichuan Blue Whales players
Sportspeople from Hawthorne, California
Sportspeople from Riverside County, California
Zhejiang Lions players